Live in Europe is the sixth album by trumpeter Dave Douglas, his first live album, and the third to feature his Tiny Bell Trio. It was released on the Arabesque label in 1997 and features performances by Douglas, Brad Schoeppach and Jim Black.

Reception
The Allmusic review by Scott Yanow states "The music often looks towards Eastern Europe folk melodies but maintains its ties with American jazz and is full of constant surprises. As with virtually all of Dave Douglas' projects, this CD is well worth exploring".

Track listing
 "Around the Bend" - 7:13
 "Bardot" - 5:42
 "Zeno" - 11:41
 "Preprandial" - 3:41
 "Song for My Father-in-Law/Uncle Wiggly" - 9:46
 "Langsam" (Schumann) - 3:58
 "Not Thinkin' Too Good" - 8:21
 "If the Cherry Tree Still Stands" - 6:17
 "Czardas" (traditional Hungarian) - 6:17
All compositions by Dave Douglas except as indicated
Tracks 1,3,6 & 8 recorded at Theatre an der Molenlaan, Bussum (Holland) on October 24, 1996; Tracks 2,4 & 7 recorded at Bimhuis, Amsterdam on October 23, 1996; Track 5 recorded at Paradox, Tilburg (Holland) on October 22, 1996; Track 9 recorded at Luchtbal, Antwerp (Belgium) on October 10, 1996

Personnel
Dave Douglas: trumpet
Brad Schoeppach: guitar
Jim Black: drums

References

Dave Douglas (trumpeter) live albums
1997 live albums
Arabesque Records live albums